Steve Potts may refer to:

Steve Potts (jazz musician) (born 1943), American jazz saxophonist
Steve Potts (footballer) (born 1967), American-born English football coach and former professional footballer
Steve Potts (drummer), drummer with Booker T. & the M.G.'s
Stephen Potts, British children's author
Stephen D. Potts, director of the United States Office of Government Ethics, 1990−2000